Andrea Broccardo (born December 18, 1982) is an Italian comic artist known for his work in the Star Wars franchise and the Marvel franchise including on comics such as Star Wars:Doctor Aphra, Star Wars(2015), and The Amazing Spider Man.

Biography 
Andrea Broccardo was born in 1982 in Asti, Italy. He started attending the School of Comics between 1999 and 2000, and in 2004, start collaborating with a small independent Italian comics company called La Compagnia del Comics. In 2013, he was noticed by Marvel editor CB Cebulski and start collaborating  as a studio assistant to Luigi Piccatto. In  2015, he went to Comic Con in New York,  where he resumed contact with the Marvel editors and stated working for Lucasfilm.

Bibliography 

 Absolute Carnage: Captain Marvel #1(2019)
 Civil War II: X-Men #1
 Civil War II: X-Men #2
 Civil War II: X-Men #3(2016)
Civil War II: X-Men #4(2016)
Doctor Strange/Punisher: Magic Bullets #1(2016)
 Doctor Strange/Punisher: Magic Bullets #2(2017)
 Doctor Strange/Punisher: Magic Bullets #3(2017)
 Doctor Strange/Punisher: Magic Bullets #4(2017)
 Doctor Strange/Punisher: Magic Bullets Infinite Comic #1
 Doctor Strange/Punisher: Magic Bullets Infinite Comic #2(2016)
Doctor Strange/Punisher:Magic Bullets Infinite Comic #3(2016)
Doctor Strange/Punisher: Magic Bullets Infinite Comic #5(2017)
 Doctor Strange/Punisher: Magic Bullets Infinite Comic #6(2017)
 Doctor Strange/Punisher: Magic Bullets Infinite Comic #7(2017)
 Doctor Strange/Punisher: Magic Bullets Infinite Comic #8(2017)
 Empyre: X-Men #3(2020)
 Kanan - The Last Padawan #12
 Monsters Unleashed #6
 Monster Unleashed #7(2017)
 Monsters Unleased #8(2017)
 Robert E. Howard's Dark Agnes #2(2020)
 Star Wars #56(2018)
 Star Wars #61(2019)
 Star Wars #62(2019)
 Star Wars #108 (2019)
 Star Wars: Age of Rebellion Special #1(2019)
 Star Wars: Doctor Aphra #7(2017)
Star Wars: Doctor Aohra #8(2017)
 Star Wars: Doctor Aphra #31(2019)
 Star Wars: Doctor Aphra #33(2019)
 Star Wars: Doctor Aphra #34(2019)
 Star Wars: Doctor Aphra #35(2019)
 Star Wars: Poe Dameron Annual #2(2018)
 The Amazing Spider-Man #1.6(2016)
 X-Men: Curse Of The Man-Thing #1(2021)

References 

Italian comics artists
Living people
1982 births
Marvel Comics people
Lucasfilm people
21st-century Italian male artists